Godington Boundry is an album by British musician Davy Graham, released in 1970. It is credited to "Davy Graham & Holly".

Reception

In his Allmusic review, critic Ritchie Unterberger wrote, "This isn't Graham's most focused or impressive album, but is basically in the same league as most of his early catalog"

Track listing
"I'm a Freeborn Man (of the Travelling People)" (Ewan MacColl) – 2:11
"The Preacher" (Horace Silver) – 2:59
"All of Me" (Gerald Marks, Seymour Simons) – 5:05
"Afta" (Keshav Sathe) – 3:20
"On Green Dolphin Street" (Bronisław Kaper, Ned Washington) – 1:58
"Dallas Rag" (Traditional) – 1:43
"'Round Midnight" (Thelonious Monk, Cootie Williams, Bernie Hanighen) – 4:37
"Work Song" (Nat Adderley, Oscar Brown, Jr.) – 8:14
"Joe, Joe, the Cannibal Kid" (Traditional; arranged by Davy Graham) – 1:48
"Everything's Fine Right Now" (Mike Heron) – 1:42
"A Mighty Fortress Is Our God (Eine feste Burg ist unser Gott)" (Martin Luther; arranged by Davy Graham) – 1:56
"Mother Nature's Son" (John Lennon, Paul McCartney) – 1:55
"Grooveyard" (Carl Perkins) – 3:38
"Forty Ton Parachute" (Davy Graham) – 1:14
"Nadu Silma" (Ahmed Abdul-Malik) – 2:41

Personnel
Davy Graham – vocals, guitar
Holly Gwyn – vocals
Keshav Sathe – tabla
Eddie Tripp – bass
Tony Kinsey – drums
Technical
Frank Lee - producer, arrangements
Gerry Kitchingham - engineer

References 

1970 albums
Davey Graham albums
See for Miles Records albums